I Pity the Fool is a 2006 American reality television series starring Mr. T, originally aired on TV Land.

Premise
The series features Mr. T traveling from town to town giving advice, solving problems and teaching individuals some basic life rules.  He mainly gives advice about playing fair and maintaining a good team spirit. The name of the show comes from Mr. T's catch phrase from Rocky III where he played the character James "Clubber" Lang. The show only lasted for six episodes.

Episodes

References

External links

2006 American television series debuts
2006 American television series endings
2000s American reality television series
English-language television shows
Personal development television series
Television series by Lionsgate Television
TV Land original programming
Mr. T